Ngozi Cynthia Nwokocha (born 28 September 1986) is a Nigerian sprinter. She competed in the women's 4 × 400 metres relay at the 2004 Summer Olympics.

References

External links
 

1986 births
Living people
Athletes (track and field) at the 2004 Summer Olympics
Nigerian female sprinters
Olympic athletes of Nigeria
Place of birth missing (living people)
Olympic female sprinters